Anazapta is a 2002 British mystery thriller film directed by Alberto Sciamma and starring Jason Flemyng, Lena Headey, Christopher Fairbank, Ian McNeice, Jeff Nuttall. In the US the film was released as Black Plague.

Plot
The film is set in England in 1348. While the Hundred Years War rages on between England and France, a detachment of soldiers returns to the estate of the beautiful English noblewoman Lady Matilda (Lena Headey) with news that her husband, Sir Walter de Mellerby (Jon Finch), was captured and remains hostage in France.

Meanwhile, the soldiers led by her husband's nephew Nicholas (Jason Flemyng) have brought with them a prisoner, Jacques de Saint Amant (David La Haye), the son of the one holding her husband. He can be exchanged for Sir Walter and for an additional ransom, which will save her estate from bankruptcy, as they are deeply in debt to the bishop. When Lady Matilda asks the  bishop (Ian McNeice) for time to get the ransom, he informs her that he will expect sexual favors from her if the money does not arrive.

After some time, however, the inhabitants of the manor begin to die, one by one, a mysterious and painful death. Lady Matilda starts suspecting that the prisoner, whom she has come to care for, is not the one he claims to be.

Cast
Lena Headey as Lady Matilda Mellerby 
David La Haye as Jacques de Saint Amant 
Jason Flemyng as Nicholas 
Christopher Fairbank as Steward 
Anthony O'Donnell as Randall 
Jeff Nuttall as Priest 
Ralph Riach as Physician
Hayley Carmichael as Agnes 
Ian McNeice as Bishop 
Jon Finch as Sir Walter de Mellerby

References

External links

2002 films
2000s thriller films
British mystery thriller films
Films set in the 14th century
2000s English-language films
Films directed by Alberto Sciamma
2000s British films